Lumsden is a surname of Scottish origin. Notable people with the surname include:

Alexander Lumsden (1843–1904), Canadian politician
Andrew Lumsden (bishop) (1654–1733), Bishop of Edinburgh 1727-1733
Andrew Lumsden (choral director) (born 1962), son of David Lumsden
Andrew Lumsden (scientist) (born 1947), British neurobiologist
Andrew J. Lumsden, see Te Radar
Anthony J. Lumsden (1928–2011), American architect
Charles J. Lumsden (born 1949), Canadian biologist
David Lumsden (musician) (1928-2023), father of Andrew Lumsden
David Lumsden (poet) (born 1964), Australian poet, see Nocturnal Submissions
David Lumsden (actor), British actor, see Wild Geese II
David Gordon Allen d'Aldecamb Lumsden (1933–2008), Scottish businessman
Dugald McTavish Lumsden (1851–1915), Scottish soldier
Eddie Lumsden (1936–2019), Australian rugby league footballer
Eddie Lumsden (born 1952), American politician
Ernest Lumsden (1883–1948), British etcher and authority on etching
Ernie Lumsden (1890–1982), Australian Rules footballer
Frank Lumsden (1913–1965), English football player
Brigadier General Frederick Lumsden (1872–1918), World War I British soldier (awarded the VC)
Geoffrey Lumsden (1914–1984), British character actor
George Lumsden (1815–1904), 19th century New Zealand politician
Glenn Lumsden (born 1964), Australian comic book artist and writer
Lieutenant-General Harry Lumsden (1821–1896), 19th century British general in India
Lieutenant General Herbert Lumsden (1897–1945), World War II British general
Ian Lumsden (born 1923), Scottish rugby union player
Jack Lumsden (1927–2012), British Olympic pentathlete
James Lumsden (disambiguation)
Jan Lumsden (born 1945), Australian woman's cricket player
Jesse Lumsden (born 1982), Canadian League Football League player and bobsledder
Jimmy Lumsden (born 1947), Scottish football player
John Lumsden (1869–1944), Irish physician
John Lumsden (footballer) (1960–2016), Scottish footballer
John McVeagh Lumsden (1823–1898), 19th century Canadian politician
Louisa Lumsden (1840–1935)
Matthew Lumsden (1777–1835), Scottish orientalist
Neil Lumsden (born 1952), former Canadian Football League player
Norman Lumsden (1906–2001), British opera singer and actor
General Peter Lumsden (1829–1918), 19th century British general in India
Rachel Lumsden (1835-1908), British nurse and hospital manager
Richard Lumsden (born 1965), British actor
Roddy Lumsden (1966–2020), Scottish poet
Simon Lumsden, philosopher at University of New South Wales
Todd Lumsden (born 1978), English football player and manager
Tyler Lumsden (born 1983), baseball pitcher
Viv Lumsden (born 1952), Scottish newsreader

References

Surnames of Scottish origin